Yermolaev Design Bureau was a Soviet OKB (design bureau) formed in 1939 around Vladimir Yermolaev. Upon his death in 1944, it was absorbed into the Sukhoi OKB.

Aircraft
Yermolaev Yer-2

Aircraft manufacturers of the Soviet Union
Design bureaus